Mount Pleasant Airfield Oval is a cricket ground at Mount Pleasant, Falkland Islands. It is the only one in the Falkland Islands and has an artificial surface . It is located at the airport Mount Pleasant. In addition, the sports complex has 2 football pitches and tennis court.

References

External links
 Cricket Archive
 Cricket Archive

Sport in the Falkland Islands
Cricket grounds in the Falkland Islands